Statistics of Japanese Regional Leagues for the 1972 season.

Champions list

League standings

Kanto

Tokai

Kansai

1972
Jap
Jap
3